"Pilot" is the first and second episodes, respectively, of the American science fiction television series Legends of Tomorrow. The episodes were announced in May and September 2015, respectively, and released on January 21 and 28, 2016.

Plot

Part 1 
In 2166, the immortal warrior Vandal Savage has conquered the entire planet. In an effort to save humanity, Time Master Rip Hunter travels back to 2016 to assemble a group of superheroes and supervillains to stop Savage's rise to power: Ray Palmer, Sara Lance, Jefferson Jackson and Martin Stein, Mick Rory, Leonard Snart, Carter Hall, and Kendra Saunders. Hunter takes them to 1975 to talk to Professor Boardman, a leading expert on Savage. While providing information on Savage, Boardman also reveals that he is the son of Kendra and Carter from one of their past reincarnations. Meanwhile, a time-traveling bounty hunter named Chronos attacks Hunter's ship, the Waverider. The team is able to regroup and escape, but not before Boardman is mortally wounded. The attack forces Hunter to reveal that Chronos is after him for stealing the Waverider and going on the mission against the Time Council's wishes and that part of his quest is based on his desire for revenge on Savage for murdering his wife and son in 2166. All members agree to aid Hunter, who warns that time will resist against the mission. In Norway 1975, Savage is shown in possession of weapons of mass destruction.

Part 2 
Still in 1975, the team infiltrates a weapons auction, where Savage intends to sell the nuclear warhead. Savage becomes aware of their presence. They all escape, but not before a piece of Ray's suit is left behind. Angry at the recklessness, Hunter points out what happens and how the technology of Ray's suit will be used to create super weapons that lead to the destruction of Central City in 2016. The team splits up, with Stein, Jax, and Sara retrieving the missing piece of Ray's suit by the help of Stein's younger self while Ray, Leonard, and Mick go in search of the dagger that killed Kendra and Carter in their first life. The dagger turns out to be in the home of Savage, who imprisons them and calls the rest of the team. Kendra and Carter go after Savage while the rest take on Savage's men. During the fight, Savage kills Carter with the dagger, revealing that only Kendra can wield it to kill him. She becomes injured, and the team is forced to retreat and plan a new strategy, determined to stop Savage.

Production

Development 
"Pilot, Part 1" was revealed in May 2015 to premiere in January 2016. The title of the episode, along with its writing credits of Greg Berlanti, Marc Guggenheim, Andrew Kreisberg, and Phil Klemmer, and the directing credit for Glen Winter was revealed on Twitter by Guggenheim. The credits and title for "Pilot, Part 2" was announced in September 2015.

Casting 
In January 2015, it was revealed that the show would feature Brandon Routh as Ray Palmer, based on the DC Comics character of the same name. Later, Wentworth Miller, Victor Garber, and Caity Lotz were said to be reprising their roles from previous Arrowverse media in the series as Leonard Snart, Martin Stein, and Sara Lance, the latter of which would be taking the name White Canary, as well as revealing the antagonist as Vandal Savage. In March, Dominic Purcell was revealed to be reprising his role as Mick Rory in the series. At the end of the month, Arthur Darvill was cast as Rip Hunter, one of the "new to TV" DC characters, while Ciara Renée was cast as Kendra Saunders / Hawkgirl. Also in April 2015, Franz Drameh was cast as Jefferson Jackson, the second half of F.I.R.E.S.T.O.R.M.

Also making guest appearances in the first and second episodes are Stephen Amell as Oliver Queen, the star of Arrow; Katie Cassidy as Laurel Lance, a main character from Arrow, Peter Francis James as Aldus Boardman, the son of Kendra Saunders and Carter Hall in previous reincarnations, and Neal McDonough as Damien Darhk, a recurring character on the fourth season of Arrow.

Filming 
Both episodes were filmed together "in tandem" in September 2015.

Reception

Ratings 
The first part of the episode received a Nielson TV rating of 1.2/4 and was watched by 3.21 million viewers, with the second part receiving a 1.1/3 rating as well and 2.89 viewers.

Critical response 
The pilot was well reviewed for its potential. Russ Burlingame from ComicBook.com praised it saying, "The series delivers a sharp, enjoyable pilot that's arguably the most attention-grabbing and entertaining from any of the current crop of superhero shows." Jesse Schedeen of IGN gave the first part of the pilot episode a 7.7/10, praising the show's "epic scope", "fun character dynamics", and Arthur Darvill's performance; and gave the second part of the pilot an 8.4/10, saying it "improved in its sophomore episode thanks to great character dynamics and superhero action". However, review aggregation website Rotten Tomatoes gave the first part only a 67% approval rating, with an average rating of 6.2/10 based on 18 reviews. The website's consensus reads that it "suffers from too many characters and too much exposition, but there's fun to be had in the chaos." Rotten Tomatoes gave the second part an 88% approval rating, with an average rating of 7.28/10 based on reviews from 17 critics. The consensus reads, "Legends sprints ahead in "Part 2," an exciting, action-packed episode that finishes setting up what could be one of the funnest comic book adaptations yet".

References

External links 
 
 

2016 American television episodes
Legends of Tomorrow
Crossover science fiction television episodes
Legends of Tomorrow episodes
Television episodes about murder
Television episodes written by Greg Berlanti
Television episodes written by Marc Guggenheim
Television episodes written by Andrew Kreisberg